Ernst Constantin Ranke (10 September 1814, Wiehe – 30 July 1888, Marburg an der Lahn) was a German Protestant theologian; since 1850, a professor of church history. He was the brother of historian Leopold von Ranke (1795–1886), theologian Friedrich Heinrich Ranke (1798–1876) and philologist Karl Ferdinand Ranke (1802–1876).

Biography

He studied theology in Leipzig, Berlin and Bonn, and later became a pastor in the town of Buchau. From 1850 onward, he was a full professor of theology at Marburg University, where he taught classes in church history and New Testament exegesis. In 1865/1866 he served as university rector.

He was a councillor of the Lutheran consistory with great impact to the issues of the Church of Hesse-Cassel. He wrote poems and published translations of the Bible and books of songs.

Principal works 

 Das kirchliche Perikopensystem aus den ältesten Urkunden der Römischen Liturgie (Berlin, 1847). 
 Das Buch Tobias, metrisch übersetzt (Bayreuth, 1847); The Book of Tobit, translated metric.
 Kritische Zusammenstellung der... neunen Perikopenkreise (Berlin, 1850). 
 Specimen codicis Novi Testamenti Fuldensis (Marburg, 1860).
 Codex Fuldensis : Novum Testamentum Latine interprete Hieronymo (Marburg, 1868).
 Fragmenta versionis sacrarum scripturarum Latinae Antehieronymianae e codice manuscripto (1868).

Poems 

 Gedichte, dem Vaterland gewidme (1848); "Poems, dedicated to the homeland". 
 An das deutsche Volk, Ged (1848); 
 Carmina academica (Marburg, 1866); 
 Lieder aus grossen Zeit (1872); 
 Horae Lyricae (Bécs, 1874); 
 Die Schlacht im Teutoburger Walde (Marburg, 1876); "The Battle of Teutonburg Forest". 
 Rhythmica: Praeit Hugonis Grotii effigies (Bécs, 1881); 
 De Laude Nivis (Marburg, 1886).

References

External links 
  ADB: Ranke, Ernst] at Allgemeine Deutsche Biographie

1814 births
1888 deaths
People from Wiehe
German Lutheran theologians
19th-century German Protestant theologians
Academic staff of the University of Marburg
19th-century German male writers
German male non-fiction writers
19th-century Lutherans